SS Ben Dearg  also known as the Thomas Alexander, Etoile Polaire, Daily Express and the Turcoman. The Castle-class trawler was originally built in 1920 for the United Kingdom Admiralty as the Thomas Alexander, and served most of its life as a trawler in French and English fisheries. It was renamed as Ben Dearg in 1936 and was requisitioned as a minesweeper in World War II in 1939 by the British Admiralty.
 
The iron hulled trawler arrived in Albany, W. A. in 1949.

The single screw steamer was coal burning, with a single ended boiler that generated 180lbs. per square inch of pressure of steam. Both Ben Dearg and the sister vessel Commiles were considered to be obsolete and unsuitable for fishing in the Great Australian Bight by 1951, and were looking for fishing grounds closer to Albany which they could trawl safely.

An attempt was made to sell the vessel by Anglo-Australian Fisheries Limited in February 1954.

Following the liquidation of Anglo-Australian Fisheries Limited, the trawler was sold to Krasnostein and Company, a company based in Perth, in June 1954. It was advertised later in the year for £8000.

The single screw steamer was scuttled on 14 April 1956 off Ben Dearg Beach near Swarbricks Beach, between Herald Point and Islet Point along the coast to the east of Albany in the Great Southern region of Western Australia, very close to the coal hulk Margaret.

The ship's propeller is on display outside the Western Australian Museum, Albany.

See also

References

Shipwrecks of Western Australia
Iron and steel steamships of Australia
1920 ships
Castle-class trawlers
Scuttled vessels of Australia